Besik Serodinovich Kudukhov (15 August 1986 – 29 December 2013) was a Russian freestyle wrestler of Ossetian descent. He won a bronze medal in the 55 kg category at the 2008 Olympics. He also won a silver medal in the 60 kg category at the 2012 Summer Olympics in London.

Career
Kudukhov took up wrestling in 1995 and was selected for the Russian national team in 2005. He was an Olympic finalist in 2012 and was considered one of the most dominant wrestlers in modern wrestling history.  He was a world champion four times across two weight classes winning every world championship he competed in from 2007 to 2011.  He was a finalist in the 2006 World Championships in Guangzhou, China at the age of 20.  He was also a European Champion in 2007.

Kudukhov died on 29 December 2013 in a car crash on a federal highway in southern Russia between Krasnodar Krai and Vladikavkaz after he lost control of his car and collided with an oncoming truck.

On 29 August 2016, a report indicated that a retested sample for Kudukhov taken at the time of the 2012 Olympic 60 kg freestyle wrestling event had returned a positive result (later disclosed as dehydrochlormethyltestosterone).

On 27 October 2016, the IOC stated that the fact that Kudukhov had died was not known at the time the decision to include his samples in the re-analysis process was made.

Consequently, the IOC dropped all disciplinary proceedings: such proceedings cannot be conducted against a deceased person, meaning Olympic results that would have been reviewed will remain uncorrected as the proceedings cannot move forward. In any event, bronze medalist Yogeshwar Dutt had earlier refused to accept the silver medal, expressing his wish for Kudukhov's family to retain it.

References

1986 births
2013 deaths
Olympic wrestlers of Russia
Wrestlers at the 2008 Summer Olympics
Wrestlers at the 2012 Summer Olympics
Olympic bronze medalists for Russia
Olympic medalists in wrestling
Ossetian people
Medalists at the 2012 Summer Olympics
Medalists at the 2008 Summer Olympics
Road incident deaths in Russia
World Wrestling Championships medalists
Russian male sport wrestlers
Russian sportspeople in doping cases
Doping cases in wrestling
Olympic silver medalists for Russia
European Wrestling Championships medalists
20th-century Russian people
21st-century Russian people
World Wrestling Champions